The Colorado Mammoth are a lacrosse team based in Denver, Colorado playing in the National Lacrosse League (NLL). The 2010 season will be the 24th in franchise history and 8th as the Mammoth (previously the Washington Power, Pittsburgh Crossefire, and Baltimore Thunder).

On January 19, after an 0-2 start, head coach Bob McMahon was fired and replaced on an interim basis by team president and general manager Steve Govett. After bring brought on as an assistant coach in late February, Bob Hamley was made head coach on March 22. Hamley luck wasn't much better, as the Mammoth finished 4-12 (including 0-8 at home) and out of the playoffs.

Regular season

Conference standings

Game log
Reference:

Transactions

Trades

Entry draft
The 2009 NLL Entry Draft took place on September 9, 2009. The Mammoth selected the following players:

Roster

See also
2010 NLL season

References

Colorado
2010 in sports in Colorado